Sangam, (from Sangama, the Sanskrit word for confluence) may refer to:

Confluence of rivers
Sangam, any confluence of two or more rivers in Indian languages
The Triveni Sangam, the confluence of three rivers at Allahabad: the Ganges, Yamuna and the mythical Saraswat

Tamil history
Tamil Sangams, legendary assemblies of Tamil scholars and poets in the remote past
Sangam period, the earliest period of South Indian history, when the Tamil Sangams were held
Sangam literature,  a collection of Tamil literature
First Sangam
Second Sangam
Third Sangam

Places
Sangam, Akhnoor, a village in Jammu and Kashmir
Sangam, Anantnag, a village in Jammu and Kashmir
Sangam, Nellore district, a village in Andhra Pradesh
Sangam, Srikakulam district, a triveni sangam (triple confluence) in Andhra Pradesh
Sangam (Warangal district), a mandal and village in Warangal district in Andhra Pradesh
Sangama, Srirangapatna, a confluence of rivers in Karnataka

Education
Sangam World Girl Guide/Girl Scout Center, located in Pune, Maharashtra, India

Film and music
Sangam (1964 Hindi film), a 1964 Raj Kapoor, Vyjayantimala & Rajendra Kumar film
Sangam (1964 Urdu film), a 1964 Pakistani Urdu feature film
Sangam (1997 film), a 1997 Syed Noor film
Sangam: Michael Nyman Meets Indian Masters a 2003 album by Michael Nyman and U. Srinivas
Sangam (album), a 2004 jazz album by Charles Lloyd, with Zakir Hussain and Eric Harland

Sangama 
Sangama or Mekedaatu, Confluence of Arkawathy and Cauvery rivers located in Karnataka
Sangama (film), a 2008 Kannada film starring Ganesh and Vedhika
Sangama Dynasty, the first dynasty of the Vijayanagara Empire
Sangamagrama, a town located in Kerala
Kudalasangama
Sangama (human rights group)

Korean
Sangam-dong, a neighbourhood of Mapo-gu, Seoul, South Korea
Sangam Stadium, the Seoul World Cup Stadium

See also
 Sanga (disambiguation)
 Sangh (disambiguation)
 Sangha (disambiguation)